Arnas Butkevičius (born 22 October 1992) is a Lithuanian professional basketball player who plays for Žalgiris Kaunas of the Lithuanian Basketball League (LKL) and EuroLeague.

Professional career
Arnas was alumni of V.Knašius Basketball School at his young age, started his professional career at Neringa's Kuršiai in third Lithuanian league when he was 17. Next season he joined Sakalai in LKL. Arnas joined Neptūnas in 2013, after showing good performance in Lithuanian Basketball League playing for BC Lietkabelis scoring 8.1 points and 3.4 rebounds and 1.4 steals at his last season there, before the end of the season he joined Neptūnas for the playoffs. He quickly became an important part for the team, helping Neptūnas reach the LKL finals twice, as well as playing in the EuroLeague and EuroCup competitions.

Career statistics

EuroLeague

|-
| style="text-align:left;"| 2014–15
| style="text-align:left;"| Neptūnas
| 10 || 1 || 20.5 || .558 || .471 || .519 || 2.8 || 1.1 || .9 || .5 || 7.0 || 7.8
|- class="sortbottom"
| colspan=2 style="text-align:center;"| Career
| 10 || 1 || 20.5 || .558 || .471 || .519 || 2.8 || 1.1 || .9 || .5 || 7.0 || 7.8

References
 Arnas Butkevičius. Lietuvos Krepšinio Lyga (Lithuanian Basketball League). Accessed 2014-09-18.

External links
 Arnas Butkevičius at euroleague.net
 Arnas Butkevičius at LKL.lt

1992 births
Living people
BC Lietkabelis players
BC Neptūnas players
BC Rytas players
Lithuanian men's basketball players
Small forwards
Basketball players from Klaipėda
2019 FIBA Basketball World Cup players